The 1979 New Zealand Open was a men's professional tennis tournament. The event was part of the 1979 Grand Prix circuit and was held in Auckland, New Zealand. It was the 12th edition of the tournament and was played on outdoor hardcourts and was held from 2 January through 8 January 1979. Eighth-seeded Tim Wilkison won the singles title.

Finals

Singles

 Tim Wilkison defeated  Peter Feigl 6–3, 4–6, 6–4, 2–6, 6–2
 It was Wilkinson's only title of the year and the 2nd of his career.

Doubles
 Bernard Mitton /  Kim Warwick defeated  Andrew Jarrett /  Jonathan Smith 6–3, 2–6, 6–3
 It was Mitton's 1st title of the year and the 2nd of his career. It was Warwick's 1st title of the year and the 9th of his career.

References

External links
 ATP – tournament profile
 ITF – tournament edition details

Heineken Open
Heineken
ATP Auckland Open
January 1979 sports events in New Zealand
New